Sajah bint Al-Harith ibn Suayd (fl. 630s CE) from the tribe of Banu Taghlib, was an Arab Christian protected first by her tribe; then causing a split within the Arab tribes and finally defended by Banu Hanifa. Sajah was one of a series of people (including her future husband) who claimed prophethood in 7th-century Arabia and was also the only female claiming to be a prophetess during the Wars of Apostasy in Early Islamic Period. Her father, Al-Harith, belonged to the Banu Taghlib tribe of Iraq.

History
During the Wars of Apostasy which emerged following the death of Islamic prophet Muhammad, Sajah declared she was a prophetess after learning that Musaylimah and Tulayha had declared prophethood. Before claiming to be a prophetess, Sajah had a reputation as a soothsayer. Thereafter, 4,000 people gathered around her to march on Medina. Others joined her against Medina. However, her planned attack on Medina was called off after she learned that the army of Khalid ibn al-Walid had defeated Tulayha al-Asadi (another self-proclaimed prophet). Thereafter, she sought cooperation with Musaylimah to oppose the threat of Khalid. A mutual understanding was initially reached with Musaylimah. However, Sajah later married Musaylimah and accepted his self-declared prophethood. Khalid then crushed the remaining rebellious elements around Sajah, and then moved on to crush Musaylimah. After the Battle of Yamama, where Musaylimah was killed, Sajah converted to Islam.

See also
Musaylimah
Al-Aswad Al-Ansi
Layla bint al-Minhal
Hind bint Utbah
Saf ibn Sayyad
Ridda wars

References

Further reading
Encyclopaedia of Islam By Mufti M. Mukarram Ahmed, Muzaffar Husain Syed pg.231
The origins of the Islamic state By Aḥmad ibn Yaḥyā al-Balādhurī, Abu Al-Abbas Ahmad Bin Jabir Al-Baladhuri, Philip Khûri Ḥitti pg.151
Smaller Signs of the Day By Muhammad bin Bayyûmi, Alig Abdul Ahad, pg.44

Female religious leaders
Women in medieval warfare
History of Islam
Arab women
Banu Tamim
Converts from Christianity
Women in war in the Middle East
Arab prophets
Self-declared messiahs
7th-century Arabs
People of the Ridda Wars
Arab women in war